Kawauso, meaning "river otter" in Japanese, can refer to:

 Otters (see Otter#Japanese folklore)
 Kawauso-kun, a fictional character from the manga series Uturun Desu.